Ian Mahinmi (born November 5, 1986) is a French former professional basketball player. At 6'11" and 250 lb, he played the center position and was selected with the 28th overall pick in the 2005 NBA draft by the San Antonio Spurs.

Early life
Mahinmi was born to a Beninese father who helped other Africans immigrate to France and a Jamaican mother who taught in a preschool. Mahinmi preferred playing soccer as a child along with his older brother, but eventually switched to playing basketball. He was 6 feet tall when he was 14 years old.

Professional career

Le Havre (2003–2006) 

Mahinmi made his impression on international scouts at the 2004 Under-18 European Championships in Zaragoza, Spain. It was there that he first caught the attention of international scouts, including San Antonio Spurs scout Sam Presti. After playing with the French national team he signed his first contract with the club STB Le Havre (France). He played three seasons with Le Havre, averaging 9.7 points and 5.2 rebounds per game in 2005–06.

Pau-Orthez (2006–2007) 
In the summer of 2006, Mahinmi signed a contract to play for Pau Orthez in France's top professional league.  He averaged 4.3 points and 3.2 rebounds in 12.7 minutes in the 2006–07 season, helping the team win the French Cup.

San Antonio Spurs (2007–2010)
Mahinmi was selected 28th overall in the 2005 NBA draft by the San Antonio Spurs, which surprised many other teams and league officials because he wasn't among the 128 players listed in the league's draft guide. Mahinmi was considered a "project" that would be a couple of years from competing in the NBA. The Spurs' interest in Mahinmi related to their need for an athletic big man since David Robinson retired. Playing for the Spurs' 2006 summer-league team at Rocky Mountain Revue, Mahinmi demonstrated his athleticism, but had difficulty maintaining rebounding or post position without fouling. After Mahinmi moved to Pau Orthez, which had a more developed strength and nutrition program than the one at Le Havre, the Spurs also began to send a strength coach to monitor his progress.

During the 2007 Summer League, Mahinmi tore his right pectoralis minor shortly after the start of play. Despite this setback, he was signed by the Spurs on August 23, 2007. On October 30, 2007, Mahinmi made his NBA debut with the Spurs against the Portland Trail Blazers, playing only 74 seconds and registering no statistics. Mahinmi played for the Austin Toros, the Spurs' affiliate in the NBA Development League, by November. Mahinmi averaged 17.1 points and 8.2 rebounds in the NBA Development League, leading the Austin Toros to the D-League Finals in which they lost.

Dallas Mavericks (2010–2012)
Mahinmi signed with the Dallas Mavericks on July 13, 2010. On December 7, 2010, against the Golden State Warriors, Mahinmi recorded his first career double-double (12 points and 10 rebounds in 21 minutes). On January 15, 2011, Mahinmi scored a career high 17 points in a loss to the Memphis Grizzlies, going 6–6 from the floor and 5–6 from the free throw line while collecting 6 rebounds. On March 20, 2011, Mahinmi collected a career-high 13 rebounds and 9 points after playing 20 minutes in the 101–73 win over the Golden State Warriors.

On June 12, 2011, in game 6 of the NBA Finals against the Miami Heat with Dallas leading the series 3–2, Mahinmi collected a crucial offensive rebound in the closing seconds of the 3rd quarter before hitting a buzzer beater shot to further extend the Mavericks lead. Dallas went on to win the game 105–95 and Mahinmi won his first NBA championship with the Dallas Mavericks.

During the 2011 NBA lockout, Mahinmi played four games for STB Le Havre. In December 2011, he returned to the Mavericks. He scored a career high 19 points on December 30, 2011, in a game against the Toronto Raptors as the Mavericks won their first game of the 2011–12 season. Mahinmi went 6–6 from the floor and 7–11 from the free throw line while collecting 5 rebounds.

Mahinmi recorded his first career start in a 95–86 loss to the Oklahoma City Thunder.

Indiana Pacers (2012–2016)
On July 12, 2012, Mahinmi was traded to the Indiana Pacers in exchange for Darren Collison and Dahntay Jones.

In his 2014–15 year with the Indiana Pacers, Ian recorded the lowest free throw percentage in the history of the NBA, with a percentage of 30.49%. As a result, Mahinmi almost never played in the fourth quarter as teams would intentionally foul him to get extra possessions and limiting the Pacers’ Offensive rating.

On February 19, 2016, Mahinmi matched a career high with 19 points and grabbed 11 rebounds in a 101–98 win over the Oklahoma City Thunder. On March 4, 2016, Mahinmi led the Pacers with a career-high 14 rebounds and 10 points in 32 minutes in a 101–108 loss to the Charlotte Hornets. On March 27, 2016, Mahinmi helped the Pacers defeat the Houston Rockets, tying a career-high 19 points and 11 rebounds in a 104–101 win. In Game 4 of the Pacers' 2016 first-round playoff series against the Toronto Raptors, Mahinmi scored a career-high 22 points, while his 10 rebounds and five assists were both playoff career bests, as he helped the Pacers tie the series at 2–2 with a 100–83 win. In his final season with Indiana, Mahinmi recorded career highs in points (9.3), rebounds (7.1), and blocks per game (1.1).

Washington Wizards (2016–2020)

On July 7, 2016, Mahinmi signed a four-year, $64 million contract with the Washington Wizards. On October 15, 2016, he was ruled out for four to six weeks after suffering a partially torn medial meniscus in his left knee. He made his debut for the Wizards on November 26, 2016 against the San Antonio Spurs after missing the first 14 games of the season while recovering from left knee surgery. He was deactivated following this game, and on December 20, he was ruled out for another six weeks after requiring more treatment on his knees. On February 8, 2017 against Brooklyn, Mahinmi played in only his second game of the season and scored his first points. On March 7, 2017, he had a career-high seven steals in a 131–127 win over the Phoenix Suns. On March 17, 2017, he had a season-high 16 points in a 112–107 win over the Chicago Bulls. On April 12, 2017, he was ruled out for the start of the postseason with a strained left calf. He returned to action in Game 3 of the Wizards' second-round series against the Boston Celtics.

On July 6, 2021, Mahinmi announced his retirement from professional basketball.

NBA career statistics

Regular season

|-
| style="text-align:left;"| 
| style="text-align:left;"| San Antonio
| 6 || 0 || 3.8 || .500 || – || 1.000 || .8 || .2 || .0 || .7 || 3.5
|-
| style="text-align:left;"| 
| style="text-align:left;"| San Antonio
| 26 || 0 || 6.3 || .636 || – || .660 || 2.0 || .1 || .1 || .3 || 3.9
|-
| style="text-align:left;background:#afe6ba;"|†
| style="text-align:left;"| Dallas
| 56 || 0 || 8.7 || .561 || .000 || .768 || 2.1 || .1 || .3 || .3 || 3.1
|-
| style="text-align:left;"| 
| style="text-align:left;"| Dallas
| 61 || 12 || 18.7 || .546 || .000 || .639 || 4.7 || .2 || .6 || .5 || 5.8
|-
| style="text-align:left;"| 
| style="text-align:left;"| Indiana
| 80 || 2 || 16.5 || .453 || .000 || .608 || 3.9 || .3 || .5 || .8 || 5.0
|-
| style="text-align:left;"| 
| style="text-align:left;"| Indiana
| 77 || 1 || 16.2 || .481 || – || .621 || 3.3 || .3 || .5 || .9 || 3.5
|-
| style="text-align:left;"| 
| style="text-align:left;"| Indiana
| 61 || 6 || 18.8 || .552 || – || .304 || 5.8 || .5 || .5 || .8 || 4.3
|-
| style="text-align:left;"| 
| style="text-align:left;"| Indiana
| 71 || 71|| 25.6 || .589 || – || .587 || 7.1 || 1.5 || .9 || 1.1 || 9.3
|-
| style="text-align:left;"| 
| style="text-align:left;"| Washington
| 31 || 0 || 17.9 || .586 || – || .573 || 4.8 || .6 || 1.1 || .8 || 5.6
|-
| style="text-align:left;"| 
| style="text-align:left;"| Washington
| 77 || 0 || 14.9 || .556 || .000 || .703 || 4.1 || .7 || .5 || .5 || 4.8
|-
| style="text-align:left;"| 
| style="text-align:left;"| Washington
| 34 || 6 || 14.6 || .452 || .188 || .689 || 3.8 || .7 || .7 || .5 || 4.1
|-
| style="text-align:left;"| 
| style="text-align:left;"| Washington
| 38 || 35 || 21.3 || .495 || .192 || .619 || 5.7 || 1.3 || .8 || 1.2 || 7.4
|- class="sortbottom"
| style="text-align:center;" colspan="2"| Career
| 618 || 133 || 16.8 || .533 || .160 || .612 || 4.4 || .6 || .6 || .7 || 5.2

Playoffs

|-
| style="text-align:left;"| 2010
| style="text-align:left;"| San Antonio
| 2 || 0 || 9.5 || .500 || – || .750 || 1.0 || .0 || .0 || .5 || 4.5
|-
| style="text-align:left;background:#afe6ba;"|2011†
| style="text-align:left;"| Dallas
| 6 || 0 || 5.5 || .600 || – || .556 || 1.0 || .0 || .2 || .0 || 1.8
|-
| style="text-align:left;"| 2012
| style="text-align:left;"| Dallas
| 4 || 0 || 17.5 || .643 || – || .846 || 4.5 || .0 || .8 || .8 || 7.3
|- 
| style="text-align:left;"| 2013
| style="text-align:left;"| Indiana
| 18 || 0 || 8.3 || .448 || – || .300 || 2.3 || .1 || .0 || .7 || 1.6
|-
| style="text-align:left;"| 2014
| style="text-align:left;"| Indiana
| 19 || 0 || 12.7 || .481 || – || .611 || 2.4 || .2 || .3 || .8 || 1.9
|-
| style="text-align:left;"| 2016
| style="text-align:left;"| Indiana
| 7 || 7 || 24.6 || .500 || – || .600 || 5.1 || 1.1 || .7 || .9 || 8.1
|-
| style="text-align:left;"| 2017
| style="text-align:left;"| Washington
| 5 || 0 || 12.6 || .556 || – || .364 || 2.2 || 1.2 || .2 || 1.2 || 2.8
|-
| style="text-align:left;"| 2018
| style="text-align:left;"| Washington
| 6 || 0 || 8.7 || .714 || – || .909 || 1.8 || .2 || .7 || .8 || 5.0
|- class="sortbottom"
| style="text-align:center;" colspan="2"| Career
| 67 || 7 || 11.9 || .527 || – || .614 || 2.6 || .3 || .3 || .7 || 3.2

Personal life
Mahinmi and his wife, Alexis, have three daughters.

See also
 
 List of European basketball players in the United States

References

External links

FIBA Profile

1986 births
Living people
2010 FIBA World Championship players
Austin Toros players
Black French sportspeople
Centers (basketball)
Dallas Mavericks players
Élan Béarnais players
French men's basketball players
French expatriate basketball people in the United States
French expatriate sportspeople in Spain
French sportspeople of Beninese descent
French people of Jamaican descent
Sportspeople of Jamaican descent
Indiana Pacers players
National Basketball Association players from France
Power forwards (basketball)
San Antonio Spurs draft picks
San Antonio Spurs players
Sportspeople from Rouen
STB Le Havre players
Washington Wizards players